The Georgia Independent School Association (GISA) is an association of private, independent, and parochial schools throughout the state of Georgia. It was established in 1967 as the Georgia Association of Independent Schools, at the time a large number of segregation academies were being established for the purpose of providing whites-only education. In 1972, a group of schools that refused to post a racially inclusive discrimination policy formed a new organization, the Southeastern Association of Independent Schools (SEAIS), in order to continue the exclusion of African-American Children. In 1986, when the number of overtly segregated schools was declining, the SEAIS merged with the GAIS and the name was changed to GISA. Over the years, many schools have migrated between GISA and the Georgia Association of Christian Schools, which also has a history of denying admission to African-Americans.

The association provides coordination of and services for the various member schools including athletics and academic competition that are not a part of the Georgia High School Association. It further attempts to foster close relations between the member schools and the colleges and public schools in the State of Georgia.  It has nearly 160 member schools.

In 1972, the organization severed ties with six schools which continued to openly operate as segregation academies.

In 2021, GISA set up an ancillary organization, the Georgia Independent Athletic Association, to coordinate athletics for member schools.

References

External links 
 GISA main site
 GIAA athletics site
 GISA Sport Statistics
 Georgia Football Historians 
 Georgia Helmet Project (Class A)
 Georgia Helmet Project (Class AA)
Georgia Helmet Project (Class AAA)
Current GISA Region Classifications, 2019-2020

High school sports associations in the United States
Sports in Georgia (U.S. state)